The Platte River is a principal tributary of the Missouri River, in the United States.

The Platte River may also refer to:
 Platte River (Iowa and Missouri), in the United States
 Platte River (Michigan), in the United States
 Platte River (Minnesota), in the United States
 Platte River (Wisconsin), in the United States

See also
 Platte River State Park, Nebraska
 Platte River Wilderness, Wyoming and Colorado
 North Platte River, in Colorado, Wyoming and Nebraska
 South Platte River, in Colorado and Nebraska
 River Plate (disambiguation)